Ronald Edward Brooks (September 12, 1937 – March 22, 2018) was a career United States Army General Officer during the Cold War, commanding personnel and logistics of the American occupation of West Germany and later serving as executive director of the American Legion. 

He died in Indianapolis, Indiana in 2018, and is buried in his hometown of Rogersville.

References

1937 births
2018 deaths
American generals
People from Rogersville, Tennessee